The 1965–66 Yugoslav Ice Hockey League season was the 24th season of the Yugoslav Ice Hockey League, the top level of ice hockey in Yugoslavia. Eight teams participated in the league, and Jesenice have won the championship.

First round

East zone

West zone

Final round

5th–8th place

External links
Season on hrhockey

Yugoslav
Yugoslav Ice Hockey League seasons
1965–66 in Yugoslav ice hockey